Matthew Faughnan is an animation director with The Simpsons and has directed twenty four episodes. Prior to that, he was an assistant director with the show and won an Emmy award in 2003 for "Three Gays of the Condo".

Episodes of The Simpsons directed by Faughnan

Season 18
 Stop! Or My Dog Will Shoot
 Treehouse of Horror XVII - co-directed with David Silverman (as Malicious Matthew C. Faughnan)

Season 20
 Dangerous Curves

Season 21
 The Great Wife Hope

Season 22
 Loan-a Lisa

Season 23
 Treehouse of Horror XXII

Season 24
 The Day the Earth Stood Cool

Season 25
 Labor Pains

Season 26
 Treehouse of Horror XXV

Season 27
 Friend with Benefit

 Orange Is the New Yellow

Season 28
 There Will Be Buds

Season 29
 Springfield Splendor
 Whistler's Father

Season 30
 Treehouse of Horror XXIX
 Krusty the Clown
 Crystal Blue-Haired Persuasion

Season 31
 Go Big or Go Homer
 The Way of the Dog

Season 32
 Podcast News

Season 33
 Treehouse of Horror XXXII
 A Serious Flanders (Part 2)

Season 34 
 Habeas Tortoise
 Step Brother from the Same Planet

External links
 

Year of birth missing (living people)
American animators
Living people
Emmy Award winners
American television directors
American animated film directors